The Deauville 5-point scoring system is an internationally  accepted and utilized five-point scoring system for the fluorodeoxyglucose (FDG) avidity of a Hodgkin lymphoma or Non-Hodgkin lymphoma tumor mass as seen on FDG positron emission tomography:
 Score 1: No uptake above the background
 Score 2: Uptake ≤ mediastinum
 Score 3: Uptake > mediastinum but ≤ liver
 Score 4: Uptake moderately increased compared to the liver at any site
 Score 5: Uptake markedly increased compared to the liver at any site
 Score X: New areas of uptake unlikely to be related to lymphoma

Scores of 1 and 2 are considered to be negative and 4 and 5 are considered to be positive. "Score 3 should be interpreted according to the clinical context but in many Hodgkin Lymphoma patients indicates a good prognosis with standard treatment."

History 
Deauville score was developed at Guy's and Saint Thomas Hospital in London after an international meeting at Deauville, France in 2009.

References

Hodgkin lymphoma
Positron emission tomography